Isolde Eisele (born 20 October 1953) is a German rower. She competed in the women's eight event at the 1976 Summer Olympics.

References

External links
 

1953 births
Living people
German female rowers
Olympic rowers of West Germany
Rowers at the 1976 Summer Olympics
People from Esslingen am Neckar
Sportspeople from Stuttgart (region)